A leather jacket is a jacket-length coat that is usually worn on top of other apparel or item of clothing, and made from the tanned hide of various animals. The leather material is typically dyed black, or various shades of brown, but a wide range of colors is possible. Leather jackets can be designed for many purposes, and specific styles have been associated with subcultures such as greasers, motorcyclists and bikers, mobsters, military aviators (especially during and directly after World War II) and music subcultures (punks, goths, metalheads, rivetheads), who have worn the garment for protective or fashionable reasons, and occasionally to create a potentially intimidating appearance. 

Most modern leather jackets are produced in Pakistan, India, Canada, Mexico and the United States, using hides left over from the meat industry. Fabrics simulating leather such as polyurethane or PVC are used as alternatives to authentic animal hide leather depending on the needs of the wearer such as those pursuing vegan lifestyles or for economic reasons as synthetic fibers tend to be less costly than authentic leather.

History

In the early 1900s aviators and members of the military wore brown leather flight jackets. One of the first modern leather jackets, the type A1, was created by Chapal in 1925. During the Second World War the garments became known as "bomber jackets" and were heavily insulated and prized for their warmth. The jacket was often part of an overall uniform-ensemble meant to protect bomber pilots from exposure to the extreme climate conditions found at high altitude, and often incorporated sheepskin, using the intact fleece on the inside for warmth.

Russian Bolsheviks commonly wore leather jackets, which became a quasi-uniform for commissars during the Russian Civil War, and later for the members of the Cheka. Yakov Sverdlov allegedly initiated this practice.

Material
Antelope, buckskin, goatskin, sheepskin, horsehide and cowhide are the hides most commonly used to make leather jackets. As soon as the skin is removed from the animal at the meat processing plant, it is refrigerated, salted, or packed in barrels of brine. It is then sent to the tannery where the skins undergo a series of processes designed to preserve and soften the hides. Sewing materials such as thread, lining, seam tape, buttons, snaps and zippers are generally bought from outside vendors and stored in the garment factory.

Popularity

In the latter half of the 20th century, the leather jacket—in many forms—achieved iconic status and general acceptance through an inextricable link to Hollywood. Such jackets were popularized by numerous stars in the 1940s and 1950s, including actor Jimmy Stewart (who had actually commanded a U.S. bomber squadron during World War II) in the film Night Passage (1957). The brown leather jacket has become a  de rigueur part of wardrobe for the Hollywood adventurer, from Gary Cooper in For Whom the Bell Tolls to Harrison Ford in the Indiana Jones film series.

A leather jacket could be used to shape a character, providing an important ingredient used to define the very essence of 'cool'. Prime examples include the Perfecto motorcycle jacket worn by Marlon Brando's Johnny Strabler in The Wild One (1953), Honor Blackman as Cathy Gale on The Avengers, and Michael Pare in Eddie and the Cruisers duo (1983 and 1989). All these served to popularize leather jackets among American youth from the  "greaser subculture" of the 1950s and early 1960s. Later depictions of this subculture feature via The Fonz from the television series Happy Days, produced in the 1970s and 1980s, but set in the 1950s and 1960s (Fonzie's leather jacket is now housed in the Smithsonian Institution), and in the film duos Eddie and the Cruisers and  Grease. Flight jackets, also (occasionally with  fleece collars, as seen in the film Top Gun (1986), have remained fashionable for decades.

In the 1990s, a variety of leather jacket patterned after an eight ball, referred to as an eight-ball jacket, was briefly trendy. It occasionally resurfaces as a retro fashion item.

Popular culture

There are many more examples of iconic leather jackets worn in popular culture, such as the Schott Perfecto worn by the T-800 character of the Terminator films and the longer ¾ length trench coat style worn by action heroes such as Steven Seagal, by Wesley Snipes as Blade in the Blade films, by Keanu Reeves and Laurence Fishburne as Neo and Morpheus in The Matrix films, or by Richard Gibson as Herr Otto Flick on the television sitcom 'Allo 'Allo!.

Safety gear
There is a substantial difference between leather jackets made for fashion purposes, and those worn for protection, such as motorcycle personal protective equipment. Leather jackets designed for protective use are safety equipment and are heavier, thicker, and sometimes even equipped with armor, thus they are a practical item of clothing regardless of the symbolism invested in them by popular culture. A leather jacket primarily designed for fashion purposes would not be much protection in a motorcycle accident because of the jacket's flimsy construction. Motorcycle jackets often have more substantial zips, weatherproof pockets and closures, higher collars, and are styled to be longer at the back than the front to protect the kidneys of the riders from the cold while the rider is bent forward over the motorcycle.

References

Jackets
Heavy metal fashion
Jacket